Gorski Vrh (locally Vrh) is a small dispersed settlement in the hills north of the Idrijca River in the Municipality of Tolmin in the Littoral region of Slovenia. It is accessible from the village of Slap ob Idrijci via Šentviška Gora.

Geography

Gorski Vrh is a scattered village on the slope south of the highest point on the Šentviška Gora Plateau, Črv Peak, also known as Črv Hill. Košarica Hill rises in the eastern part of the village. Gorski Vrh includes the hamlets and isolated farms of Jerovica, Podkremenk, Štrin, Travnikar, and V Griču. The land has a karst character and generally lacks running surface water. There are karst caves in the vicinity, including Skrinjce Cave, where a short intermittent stream runs into the ground. The few springs in the area (at Travnikar, Oplence, Poloji, Skrinje, and Podkorito) produce water only after heavy rainfall. The hill slopes in the village are mostly covered in mixed woods. There are very few pastures in the village, but low-quality hay fields are also used for pasturing.

Name
The name of the settlement was changed from Vrh to Gorski Vrh in 1955. Locally, the settlement continues to be known as Vrh.

References

External links 

Gorski Vrh on Geopedia

Populated places in the Municipality of Tolmin